The Charleston Saints was a United States Australian Football League team based in Charleston, South Carolina, United States.

The Saints was founded in November 2011. In late 2012, the team dissolved due to player recruiting problems and lack of community support.

References

Australian rules football clubs in the United States
Australian rules football clubs established in 2011
2011 establishments in South Carolina
Sports in Charleston, South Carolina